Molly Ray Botkin (born August 26, 1943) is an American former competition swimmer and Pan American Games gold medalist.

A the 1959 Pan American Games in Chicago, she won three medals, including a gold as a member of the winning U.S. team in the women's 4×100-meter freestyle relay.  Individually, she also received a silver for her second-place finish in the 100-meter freestyle, and a bronze for a third-place performance in the 100-meter butterfly.

Botkin also represented the United States as a sixteen-year-old at the 1960 Summer Olympics in Rome, where she swam for the gold medal-winning U.S. team in the preliminary heats of the women's 4×100-meter freestyle relay.  She did not receive a medal, however, because only relay swimmers who competed in the event final were medal-eligible under the 1960 Olympic rules.

References

1943 births
Living people
American female butterfly swimmers
American female freestyle swimmers
Olympic swimmers of the United States
Pan American Games gold medalists for the United States
Pan American Games silver medalists for the United States
Pan American Games bronze medalists for the United States
Swimmers from Los Angeles
Swimmers at the 1959 Pan American Games
Swimmers at the 1960 Summer Olympics
Pan American Games medalists in swimming
Medalists at the 1959 Pan American Games
21st-century American women